This is a list of public art in the Devon county of England. This list applies only to works of public art on permanent display in an outdoor public space. For example, this does not include artworks in museums.

References 

Devon
Culture in Devon
Public art